Untying the Not is the sixth release and fourth studio album of Colorado based jam band The String Cheese Incident. The album deviates from their previous rock and bluegrass sounds and shows heavy influence from guest producer Martin Glover. Untying the Not is much darker than the band's previous lighthearted studio releases, full of minor keys and introspection on topics such as death, which are most clearly evidenced in the tracks "Elijah" and "Mountain Girl." It also shows significant evidence of the band's recent habit of introducing techno and trance elements into the mix, such as on the track "Valley of the Jig", which is a fusion of techno and bluegrass stylings.

Track listing
 "Wake Up"  (Bill Nershi) - 5:46
 "Sirens"  (Keith Moseley) - 5:07
 "Looking Glass"  (John Greer, Bill Nershi) - 5:44
 "Orion's Belt [Instrumental]"  (Bill Nershi) - 2:50
 "Mountain Girl [Instrumental]"  (The String Cheese Incident, Martin Glover) - 4:57
 "Lonesome Road Blues [Instrumental]"  (Traditional) - 1:24
 "Elijah [Instrumental]"  (Kyle Hollingsworth) - 2:41
 "Valley of the Jig"  (Traditional) - 4:03
 "Tinder Box"  (John Perry Barlow, Christina Callicott, Michael Kang) - 4:24
 "Just Passin' Through"  (John Perry Barlow, Bill Nershi) - 4:46
 "Who Am I?"  (Kyle Hollingsworth, Michaels) - 4:23
 "Time Alive"  (Michael Travis) - 5:11
 "On My Way"  (Kyle Hollingsworth) - 3:02

Credits

The String Cheese Incident
 Bill Nershi – acoustic guitar, Slide Guitar, Lap Steel Guitar
 Keith Moseley – Bass guitar, Harmonica, vocals
 Kyle Hollingsworth - Accordion, Organ, Piano, Synthesizer, Mellotron. vocals
 Michael Kang– Mandolin, Violin, vocals
 Michael Travis – percussion, drums, vocals
 Jason Hann -  Drums, percussion

Additional personnel
 Kenny Brooks - Saxophone
 Chet Helms - Spoken Word
 Carolyn Garcia - Spoken Word
 Gary The Cab Driver - Spoken Word
 Michael Gosney - Spoken Word
 Julia Butterfly Hill - Spoken Word
 Aly Itzaina - Spoken Word
 Richard MacLaury - Spoken Word
 Rock Raffa - Spoken Word

Production
 Youth - Arranger, Engineer, Artwork, Producer
 Clive Goddard - Engineer
 Stephen Marcussen - Mastering
 Rail Jon Rogut - Digital Editing
 Michael Travis - Arranger
 Kenny Brooks - Guest Appearance
 Mike Cresswell - Digital Editing
 Chet Helms - Guest Appearance
 The String Cheese Incident - Arranger
 Michael Kang - Arranger
 Keith Moseley - Arranger
 Bill Nershi - Arranger
 Kyle Hollingsworth - Arranger
 Alex Grey - Cover Art
 Carolyn Garcia - Guest Appearance
 Gary The Cab Driver - Guest Appearance
 Michael Gosney - Guest Appearance
 Julia Butterfly Hill - Guest Appearance
 April Itzaina - Guest Appearance
 Richard MacLaury - Guest Appearance
 Adam Pickard - Engineer
 Rock Raffa - Guest Appearance

References

The String Cheese Incident albums
2003 albums
Albums with cover art by Alex Grey